Norberto Ortega Sánchez (born 24 September 1963 in Victoria (Buenos Aires), Argentina) is a former professional footballer who played as a midfielder for clubs in Argentina, Spain, Chile and Colombia.

Career
Born in Victoria, Buenos Aires to a father from Almería, Spain, Ortega began playing football with Club Atlético Tigre. He had spells at San Lorenzo de Almagro and Racing Club de Avellaneda before buying out his contract from Racing so he could sign with the Segunda División's Elche CF in August 1989.

Clubs
 San Lorenzo de Almagro
 Racing Club
 Elche
 Vélez Sársfield
 Talleres de Córdoba
 Argentinos Juniors
 Godoy Cruz de Mendoza
 Tigre
 Platense
 Deportivo Cali
 Coquimbo Unido

References

External links
 

1963 births
Living people
Argentine footballers
Association football midfielders
Argentinos Juniors footballers
Club Atlético Platense footballers
Club Atlético Vélez Sarsfield footballers
Godoy Cruz Antonio Tomba footballers
San Lorenzo de Almagro footballers
Racing Club de Avellaneda footballers
Talleres de Córdoba footballers
Club Atlético Tigre footballers
Elche CF players
Deportivo Cali footballers
Coquimbo Unido footballers
Argentine expatriate footballers
Argentine expatriate sportspeople in Chile
Expatriate footballers in Chile
Argentine expatriate sportspeople in Spain
Expatriate footballers in Spain
People from San Fernando Partido
Sportspeople from Buenos Aires Province